Machimia anthracospora is a moth in the family Depressariidae. It was described by Edward Meyrick in 1934. It is found in Brazil.

References

Moths described in 1934
Machimia